William Coombs may refer to:

William H. Coombs (1808–1894), Justice of the Indiana Supreme Court
William J. Coombs (1833–1922), member of the United States House of Representatives from New York
William Coombs (paleontologist), established the genus Dyslocosaurus
W. H. Coombs (1816–1896), Anglican minister in Gawler, South Australia

See also
William Combs (disambiguation)